Bonanza: The Next Generation is a 1988 American Western television film and a sequel to the 1959–1973 television series Bonanza starring John Ireland, Robert Fuller, Barbara Anderson, Michael Landon Jr., Brian A. Smith and John Amos.

Synopsis 
When Ben Cartwright's seafaring brother, Aaron, (John Ireland) takes over the Ponderosa he signs over drilling rights to land-grabbers. Captain Aaron Cartwright's grand nephews arrive to save the ranch.

Production 
The film was written by David Dortort and Paul Savage, and directed by William F. Claxton. Bonanza: The Next Generation was the pilot for a television series that was never produced but was followed by two other television films Bonanza: The Return (1993) and Bonanza: Under Attack (1995).

Casting 
None of the characters from the original series appears since the entire cast, with the exception of Pernell Roberts, Michael Landon and David Canary, had died. Lorne Greene had signed to reprise his role as patriarch Ben, but died shortly before production began. He was replaced by veteran actor John Ireland, who played Ben's brother Aaron. The movie features Michael Landon Jr. as the son of Little Joe Cartwright, and Gillian Greene, daughter of Lorne Greene, as his love interest.

Cast
 John Ireland as Captain Aaron Cartwright
 Robert Fuller as Charlie Poke
 Barbara Anderson as Annabelle 'Annie' Cartwright
 Michael Landon Jr. as Benjamin 'Benj' Cartwright
 Brian A. Smith as Josh Cartwright
 John Amos as Mr. Mack
 Peter Mark Richman as Mr. Dunson
 Gillian Greene as Jennifer Sills
 Kevin Hagen as Nathaniel Amsted
 William Benedict as Gus Morton
 Richard Bergman as Sheriff Montooth
 Dabbs Greer as Sills
 Gary Reed as Eldon Poole
 Lee McLaughlin as Mayor
 Robert Hoy as Feathers
 Rex Linn as Cease
 Jack Lilley as Jory
 Jerry Gatlin as Deke
 Jeffrey Meyer as Lundeen
 Robert Jauregui as Cullen
 Jeffrey Boudov as Homer
 Laurie Rude as Rachel
 Clayton Staggs as Mover-Shaker
 David Q. Combs as Father

See also 

 Bonanza: The Return
 Bonanza: Under Attack

References

External links 
 

1988 television films
1988 Western (genre) films
1980s American films
1980s English-language films
American Western (genre) television films
Bonanza
CBS network films
Films directed by William F. Claxton
Television films as pilots
Television pilots not picked up as a series
Television sequel films
Television series reunion films